Animal stereotype may refer to:
 Stereotypy (non-human), repetitive behaviours of animals; the term has two meanings: 
 repetitive "abnormal" behaviours due to abnormal conditions with no obvious function
 repetitive normal behaviours due to physiological or anatomical constraints
Animal epithet, an epithet that compares a human to an animal basing on an animal  trait thought as typical to this type of animal
Anthropomorphism, ascribing a particular category of animals of human traits, emotions, or intentions.